Aleksandr Chertoganov (born 8 February 1980) is a retired Ukrainian-born Azerbaijani footballer. Internationally, he played for Azerbaijan.

Career

Club
Chertoganov signed for Gabala in the summer of 2011 from Inter Baku. In May 2013 Chertoganov parted ways with Gabala. Chertoganov went on to sign for fellow Azerbaijan Premier League side Sumgayit.
In January 2014 Chertoganov announced his retirement follow a series of back problems, but changed his mind, seeing out the season before signing a new one-year contract with Sumgayit.

Career statistics

Club

International

Statistics accurate as of match played 16 October 2012

Honours
FK Baku
Azerbaijan Cup (1): 2004–05

Inter Baku
Azerbaijan Premier League (1): 2009–10

References

External links 
 
 
 
 
 

1980 births
Living people
Ukrainian footballers
Azerbaijani expatriate footballers
Expatriate footballers in Ukraine
Azerbaijani expatriate sportspeople in Ukraine
Azerbaijani footballers
Azerbaijan international footballers
Association football midfielders
Azerbaijani people of Ukrainian descent
Footballers from Dnipro
FC Torpedo Zaporizhzhia players
FC Enerhiya Yuzhnoukrainsk players
MFC Mykolaiv players
FC Spartak Ivano-Frankivsk players
FC Baku players
Simurq PIK players
Shamakhi FK players
Gabala FC players
Sumgayit FK players
Ukrainian First League players
Ukrainian Second League players
Azerbaijan Premier League players
Neftçi PFK players